Gerald “GeBow” Bowman is an American football safety who is currently a free agent. He played college football at Southern California and in the NFL for the Baltimore Ravens.

References

American football safeties
USC Trojans football players
Baltimore Ravens players
1989 births
Living people
Players of American football from Philadelphia